The 1906 VFL season was the tenth season of the Victorian Football League (VFL), the highest level senior Australian rules football competition in Victoria. The season featured eight clubs, ran from 5 May until 22 September, and comprised a 17-game home-and-away season followed by a finals series featuring the top four clubs.

The premiership was won by the Carlton Football Club for the first time, after it defeated  by 49 points in the 1906 VFL Grand Final.

Premiership season
In 1906, the VFL competition consisted of eight teams of 18 on-the-field players each, with no "reserves", although any of the 18 players who had left the playing field for any reason could later resume their place on the field at any time during the match.

Each team played each other twice in a home-and-away season of 14 rounds. Then, based on ladder positions after those 14 rounds, three further 'sectional rounds' were played, with the teams ranked 1st, 3rd, 5th and 7th playing in one section and the teams ranked 2nd, 4th, 6th and 8th playing in the other. 

Once the 17 round home-and-away season had finished, the 1906 VFL Premiers were determined by the specific format and conventions of the amended "Argus system".

Round 1

|- bgcolor="#CCCCFF"
| Home team
| Home team score
| Away team
| Away team score
| Venue
| Date
|- bgcolor="#FFFFFF"
| 
| 8.20 (68)
| 
| 1.8 (14)
| Brunswick Street Oval
| 5 May 1906
|- bgcolor="#FFFFFF"
| 
| 8.12 (60)
| 
| 9.13 (67)
| EMCG
| 5 May 1906
|- bgcolor="#FFFFFF"
| 
| 12.19 (91)
| 
| 5.7 (37)
| Victoria Park
| 5 May 1906
|- bgcolor="#FFFFFF"
| 
| 12.11 (83)
| 
| 8.8 (56)
| Princes Park
| 5 May 1906

Round 2

|- bgcolor="#CCCCFF"
| Home team
| Home team score
| Away team
| Away team score
| Venue
| Date
|- bgcolor="#FFFFFF"
| 
| 8.5 (53)
| 
| 10.13 (73)
| MCG
| 12 May 1906
|- bgcolor="#FFFFFF"
| 
| 5.12 (42)
| 
| 11.14 (80)
| Corio Oval
| 12 May 1906
|- bgcolor="#FFFFFF"
| 
| 12.5 (77)
| 
| 8.9 (57)
| Lake Oval
| 12 May 1906
|- bgcolor="#FFFFFF"
| 
| 5.5 (35)
| 
| 15.10 (100)
| Junction Oval
| 12 May 1906

Round 3

|- bgcolor="#CCCCFF"
| Home team
| Home team score
| Away team
| Away team score
| Venue
| Date
|- bgcolor="#FFFFFF"
| 
| 10.16 (76)
| 
| 6.6 (42)
| EMCG
| 19 May 1906
|- bgcolor="#FFFFFF"
| 
| 16.10 (106)
| 
| 6.7 (43)
| Princes Park
| 19 May 1906
|- bgcolor="#FFFFFF"
| 
| 10.14 (74)
| 
| 9.7 (61)
| Lake Oval
| 19 May 1906
|- bgcolor="#FFFFFF"
| 
| 7.7 (49)
| 
| 14.8 (92)
| Brunswick Street Oval
| 19 May 1906

Round 4

|- bgcolor="#CCCCFF"
| Home team
| Home team score
| Away team
| Away team score
| Venue
| Date
|- bgcolor="#FFFFFF"
| 
| 5.9 (39)
| 
| 5.4 (34)
| MCG
| 26 May 1906
|- bgcolor="#FFFFFF"
| 
| 4.7 (31)
| 
| 8.9 (57)
| Corio Oval
| 26 May 1906
|- bgcolor="#FFFFFF"
| 
| 6.8 (44)
| 
| 1.7 (13)
| Junction Oval
| 26 May 1906
|- bgcolor="#FFFFFF"
| 
| 4.13 (37)
| 
| 8.9 (57)
| Victoria Park
| 26 May 1906

Round 5

|- bgcolor="#CCCCFF"
| Home team
| Home team score
| Away team
| Away team score
| Venue
| Date
|- bgcolor="#FFFFFF"
| 
| 6.15 (51)
| 
| 6.10 (46)
| EMCG
| 2 June 1906
|- bgcolor="#FFFFFF"
| 
| 4.7 (31)
| 
| 13.11 (89)
| Junction Oval
| 2 June 1906
|- bgcolor="#FFFFFF"
| 
| 10.9 (69)
| 
| 10.5 (65)
| Princes Park
| 4 June 1906
|- bgcolor="#FFFFFF"
| 
| 8.8 (56)
| 
| 11.9 (75)
| MCG
| 4 June 1906

Round 6

|- bgcolor="#CCCCFF"
| Home team
| Home team score
| Away team
| Away team score
| Venue
| Date
|- bgcolor="#FFFFFF"
| 
| 8.13 (61)
| 
| 3.13 (31)
| Corio Oval
| 9 June 1906
|- bgcolor="#FFFFFF"
| 
| 13.16 (94)
| 
| 6.9 (45)
| Junction Oval
| 9 June 1906
|- bgcolor="#FFFFFF"
| 
| 9.12 (66)
| 
| 6.13 (49)
| EMCG
| 9 June 1906
|- bgcolor="#FFFFFF"
| 
| 6.8 (44)
| 
| 7.14 (56)
| Brunswick Street Oval
| 9 June 1906

Round 7

|- bgcolor="#CCCCFF"
| Home team
| Home team score
| Away team
| Away team score
| Venue
| Date
|- bgcolor="#FFFFFF"
| 
| 6.5 (41)
| 
| 4.13 (37)
| Corio Oval
| 16 June 1906
|- bgcolor="#FFFFFF"
| 
| 13.12 (90)
| 
| 6.10 (46)
| Victoria Park
| 16 June 1906
|- bgcolor="#FFFFFF"
| 
| 4.15 (39)
| 
| 10.14 (74)
| Princes Park
| 16 June 1906
|- bgcolor="#FFFFFF"
| 
| 5.10 (40)
| 
| 9.8 (62)
| Lake Oval
| 16 June 1906

Round 8

|- bgcolor="#CCCCFF"
| Home team
| Home team score
| Away team
| Away team score
| Venue
| Date
|- bgcolor="#FFFFFF"
| 
| 2.8 (20)
| 
| 3.7 (25)
| Junction Oval
| 30 June 1906
|- bgcolor="#FFFFFF"
| 
| 3.8 (26)
| 
| 8.11 (59)
| Lake Oval
| 30 June 1906
|- bgcolor="#FFFFFF"
| 
| 9.7 (61)
| 
| 11.9 (75)
| Corio Oval
| 30 June 1906
|- bgcolor="#FFFFFF"
| 
| 3.7 (25)
| 
| 9.16 (70)
| MCG
| 30 June 1906

Round 9

|- bgcolor="#CCCCFF"
| Home team
| Home team score
| Away team
| Away team score
| Venue
| Date
|- bgcolor="#FFFFFF"
| 
| 11.25 (91)
| 
| 5.9 (39)
| Brunswick Street Oval
| 7 July 1906
|- bgcolor="#FFFFFF"
| 
| 16.16 (112)
| 
| 5.11 (41)
| EMCG
| 7 July 1906
|- bgcolor="#FFFFFF"
| 
| 14.14 (98)
| 
| 5.8 (38)
| Victoria Park
| 7 July 1906
|- bgcolor="#FFFFFF"
| 
| 6.13 (49)
| 
| 3.7 (25)
| Princes Park
| 7 July 1906

Round 10

|- bgcolor="#CCCCFF"
| Home team
| Home team score
| Away team
| Away team score
| Venue
| Date
|- bgcolor="#FFFFFF"
| 
| 4.11 (35)
| 
| 4.4 (28)
| Junction Oval
| 14 July 1906
|- bgcolor="#FFFFFF"
| 
| 6.8 (44)
| 
| 13.10 (88)
| Victoria Park
| 14 July 1906
|- bgcolor="#FFFFFF"
| 
| 4.5 (29)
| 
| 13.17 (95)
| MCG
| 14 July 1906
|- bgcolor="#FFFFFF"
| 
| 5.6 (36)
| 
| 8.15 (63)
| Corio Oval
| 14 July 1906

Round 11

|- bgcolor="#CCCCFF"
| Home team
| Home team score
| Away team
| Away team score
| Venue
| Date
|- bgcolor="#FFFFFF"
| 
| 9.13 (67)
| 
| 5.7 (37)
| Brunswick Street Oval
| 21 July 1906
|- bgcolor="#FFFFFF"
| 
| 4.11 (35)
| 
| 4.9 (33)
| EMCG
| 21 July 1906
|- bgcolor="#FFFFFF"
| 
| 11.14 (80)
| 
| 6.7 (43)
| Princes Park
| 21 July 1906
|- bgcolor="#FFFFFF"
| 
| 12.11 (83)
| 
| 4.3 (27)
| Lake Oval
| 21 July 1906

Round 12

|- bgcolor="#CCCCFF"
| Home team
| Home team score
| Away team
| Away team score
| Venue
| Date
|- bgcolor="#FFFFFF"
| 
| 6.21 (57)
| 
| 6.10 (46)
| Corio Oval
| 28 July 1906
|- bgcolor="#FFFFFF"
| 
| 11.16 (82)
| 
| 2.8 (20)
| Victoria Park
| 28 July 1906
|- bgcolor="#FFFFFF"
| 
| 4.6 (30)
| 
| 5.8 (38)
| Brunswick Street Oval
| 28 July 1906
|- bgcolor="#FFFFFF"
| 
| 12.12 (84)
| 
| 7.3 (45)
| Lake Oval
| 28 July 1906

Round 13

|- bgcolor="#CCCCFF"
| Home team
| Home team score
| Away team
| Away team score
| Venue
| Date
|- bgcolor="#FFFFFF"
| 
| 9.15 (69)
| 
| 5.7 (37)
| Victoria Park
| 4 August 1906
|- bgcolor="#FFFFFF"
| 
| 14.17 (101)
| 
| 5.8 (38)
| Lake Oval
| 4 August 1906
|- bgcolor="#FFFFFF"
| 
| 5.10 (40)
| 
| 10.13 (73)
| MCG
| 11 August 1906
|- bgcolor="#FFFFFF"
| 
| 5.3 (33)
| 
| 4.14 (38)
| Princes Park
| 11 August 1906

Round 14

|- bgcolor="#CCCCFF"
| Home team
| Home team score
| Away team
| Away team score
| Venue
| Date
|- bgcolor="#FFFFFF"
| 
| 13.11 (89)
| 
| 5.12 (42)
| Brunswick Street Oval
| 18 August 1906
|- bgcolor="#FFFFFF"
| 
| 10.21 (81)
| 
| 3.13 (31)
| Junction Oval
| 18 August 1906
|- bgcolor="#FFFFFF"
| 
| 6.5 (41)
| 
| 15.14 (104)
| MCG
| 18 August 1906
|- bgcolor="#FFFFFF"
| 
| 4.12 (36)
| 
| 10.12 (72)
| EMCG
| 18 August 1906

Sectional Rounds

Sectional Round 1 (Round 15)

Sectional Round 2 (Round 16)

Sectional Round 3 (Round 17)

Ladder

Semi finals

First Semi Final

|- bgcolor="#CCCCFF"
| Home team
| Home team score
| Away team
| Away team score
| Venue
| Date
|  
|- bgcolor="#FFFFFF"
| 
| 10.12 (72)
| 
| 5.6 (36)
| MCG
| 15 September 1906
| Attendance: 8,500
|- bgcolor="#FFFFFF"

Second Semi Final

|- bgcolor="#CCCCFF"
| Home team
| Home team score
| Away team
| Away team score
| Venue
| Date
|  
|- bgcolor="#FFFFFF"
| 
| 9.10 (64)
| 
| 8.6 (54)
| Brunswick Street Oval
| 15 September 1906
| Attendance: 15,000
|- bgcolor="#FFFFFF"

Grand final

Carlton defeated Fitzroy 15.4 (94) to 6.9 (45). (For an explanation of scoring see Australian rules football).

Awards
 The 1906 VFL Premiership team was Carlton.
 The VFL's leading goalkicker was Mick Grace of Carlton with 50 goals.
 Melbourne took the "wooden spoon" in 1906.

Notable events
 In Round 4, St Kilda defeated Essendon for the first time in its history after 36 winless matches (15 in the VFA for four draws and 11 losses and 21 in the VFL for one draw and 20 losses) over 20 years of competition (1878 and 1888–1906).
 On Saturday 23 June, between Rounds 7 and 8, the VFL representative team 17.13 (115) defeated the Ballarat Football Association 10.10 (70) at the Melbourne Cricket Ground. Frank Caine kicked seven goals for Victoria. On 15 September, the weekend of the semi-finals, a VFL team selected from non-finalists defeated the Bendigo Football Association 15.14 (104) d. 2.2 (14) at the Upper Reserve in Bendigo.
 In Round 8,  formally protested the result of its five point loss against , on the grounds that the timekeeper had rung the final bell thirty seconds prematurely. The protest was dismissed three weeks later owing to a lack of evidence.
 A vacant Saturday was originally scheduled on 11 August in the fixture between Rounds 13 and 14, to accommodate the second game against Ballarat and to allow clubs to complete interstate tours. However, after South Australian club Norwood's tour was brought forward, the VFL turned Round 13 into a split round at less than two weeks notice, postponing the Carlton vs Fitzroy and St Kilda vs Melbourne games by a week.
 Mick Grace of Carlton was the first VFL player to score 50 goals in a season.

References

 Rogers, S. & Brown, A., Every Game Ever Played: VFL/AFL Results 1897–1997 (Sixth Edition), Viking Books, (Ringwood), 1998. 
 Ross, J. (ed), 100 Years of Australian Football 1897–1996: The Complete Story of the AFL, All the Big Stories, All the Great Pictures, All the Champions, Every AFL Season Reported, Viking, (Ringwood), 1996.

External links
 1906 Season - AFL Tables

Australian Football League seasons
VFL season